Araeomerus is a genus of earwigs, in the family Hemimeridae, the suborder Hemimerina, and the order Dermaptera. It one of two genera in the family Hemimeridae, and contains two species.

References 

Dermaptera genera
Hemimerina